Harry Griffin was a journalist.

Harry Griffin may also refer to:

Harry Griffin (cricketer) (1873–1938), English cricketer
Harry Griffin, candidate in United States House of Representatives elections, 1940
Harry Griffin, a character in You've Got It Coming
Harry Griffin, a character in Bones of the Earth

See also
Harold Griffin (disambiguation)
Henry Griffin (disambiguation)
Harry Griffith (disambiguation)